Mohammad Ali bin Haji Mustafa is a Bruneian former national football player and coach. he is the current  Assistant coach of Brunei.

Ali was a midfielder for the Bruneian representative team than played in the Malaysian leagues in the mid-90s. He served as backup to the likes of Said Abdullah, Rosli Liman and Rosaidi Kamis.

After earning his coaching badges, Ali became head coach of Wijaya FC in 2003, then QAF FC in 2004. His tenure lasted more than a decade until his team left the Brunei Super League in 2015, but not before lifting three straight titles from 2005-06 to 2009-10. He subsequently found work with Brunei's governing body of football, NFABD, as the coach of the national under-15s in 2015.

For the 2016 season, Ali coaches the Tabuan U17 team in the Brunei Premier League. They replaced the Tabuan U18s led by Kwon Oh-son which became Tabuan U21 in the Brunei Super League. He became assistant coach to Mike Wong in the full national team after the completion of the Premier League season.

In 2020, he was re-appointed as head coach of the Brunei national football team, while still coaching Kasuka FC at club level.

International career
As was practice for Brunei's football association to send a club side for international tournaments at the time, due to QAF winning the domestic title in 2006 and 2010 Ali was appointed head coach of the Brunei national football team for the two AFC Challenge Cup campaigns of 2006 and 2009. (Brunei sent DPMM FC for games held in 2008 but the club declined in 2009 due to the hectic S.League schedule.) He only managed one win in 6 matches for the Wasps.

Personal life
His son Khairul Alimin is a football player for Wijaya FC who has represented Brunei at youth level.

References 

Living people
Bruneian footballers
Bruneian football managers
Brunei national football team managers
Brunei (Malaysia Premier League team) players
Association football midfielders
1976 births